Georg Bernhard Tennyson (July 13, 1930 – May 19, 2007) was an American scholar. He was emeritus professor of English at UCLA, a longtime editor of the journal Nineteenth-Century Literature, and a prominent scholar of Thomas Carlyle and Owen Barfield.

Biography 
Georg Bernhard Tennyson was born on July 13, 1930 in Washington, DC. His mother Emily Inez Zimmerli worked in the United States Senate, while his father, for whom he was named, owned the Tennyson Tire Company.

Tennyson earned Bachelor of Arts and Master of Arts degrees from George Washington University. In 1954, he joined the United States Army, was trained in cryptography, and deployed to a base near Freiburg im Breisgau, Germany. He served in the National Security Agency as a German translator and code breaker. Upon discharge, he earned MA and PhD degrees from Princeton University and declined an offer to join the Princeton faculty. Instead, he joined the University of North Carolina for two years before joining UCLA in 1964, where he remained until 1994. Tennyson met Owen Barfield in 1968 and was a friend and correspondent until Barfield's death in 1997, whereupon he served as co-executor of Barfield's literary estate.

Tennyson died on May 19, 2007, at Grossman Burn Center in Sherman Oaks, Los Angeles, California, following a fire at his home. He was preceded by his wife and survived by two children, four grandchildren, and his sister.

Career 
Tennyson held a certificate in Shakespeare Studies from the Shakespeare Institute and a certificate in German studies from the University of Freiburg. He was a Fellow of the British Council, the Fulbright Program, the John Simon Guggenheim Foundation, and a Summer Seminar Director for the National Endowment for the Humanities. He was a member of various scholarly organizations, including The Carlyle Society of Edinburgh, the C. S. Lewis Society of California, and the Modern Language Association.

His monograph "Sartor" Called "Resartus" (1965) has been called "the best book ever written on Thomas Carlyle". His essay "Owen Barfield and the Rebirth of Meaning" (1969) made him "a principal founder" of Barfield scholarship.

Works

References

External links 

 Entry at Encyclopedia Barfieldiana
 G. B. Tennyson Papers at the Archives of Wheaton College

1930 births
2007 deaths
George Washington University alumni
Princeton University alumni
American literary critics
American non-fiction writers
American academics
University of California, Los Angeles faculty
University of North Carolina faculty